The following is a list of Union Councils of District Peshawar.

Subdivisions
Peshawar District is divided into 4 towns (tehsils): 
Peshawar I
Peshawar II
Peshawar III
Peshawar IV

These tehsils are further subdivided into 93 union councils, with each union council having an elected "Nazim".

Peshawar I

Peshawar Town 2

Peshawar Town 3

Peshawar Town 4

References

External links 
  List of Tehsils
  Official Portal of Government of Khyber Pakhtunkhwa
  UC List with Populations
  Union-Councils-NWFP-Data-By-Aamir-Hussain
  Government Web Portal Reference

Populated places in Peshawar District